Sealdah Rajdhani Express is a Rajdhani class train of Indian Railways which connects the capital of West Bengal, Kolkata to the National Capital of India, New Delhi through Sealdah. It is the third Rajdhani Express class train connecting Delhi and Kolkata and is the third-fastest connection between these two cities by rail.

Overview 
Owing to the high demands of the passengers plying between Delhi and Kolkata and to ease down the existing pressure of bookings on the Howrah Rajdhani Express, Indian Railways decided to introduce another Rajdhani Class train between these two cities. Since Howrah Division of Eastern Railways already had two existing Rajdhani Express trains, thus Sealdah Division of Eastern Railway was awarded with third Rajdhani Express to West Bengal. Hence on 1 July 2000, the first Sealdah Rajdhani Express left for New Delhi from Sealdah for its maiden journey.

In 2003,the coaches of Sealdah Rajdhani Express were upgraded to LHB coaches replacing the older ICF coaches.

Route & Halts

Traction 
It is hauled by a Howrah based WAP-7 (HOG) equipped locomotive from end to end. Sometimes, it may receive a Ghaziabad Loco Shed based WAP-7 (HOG) equipped locomotive.

Time Table

Speed
The maximum permissible speed is 130 kmph.

Gallery

References

Delhi–Kolkata trains
Rajdhani Express trains
Rail transport in Jharkhand
Rail transport in Bihar
Rail transport in Uttar Pradesh
Railway services introduced in 2000
Rail transport in Delhi
Rail transport in West Bengal